Jarmo Erkki Övermark (born 26 May 1955 in Lappajärvi) is a Finnish former wrestler who competed in the 1976 Summer Olympics, in the 1980 Summer Olympics, and in the 1984 Summer Olympics.

References

External links
 

1955 births
Living people
People from Lappajärvi
Olympic wrestlers of Finland
Wrestlers at the 1976 Summer Olympics
Wrestlers at the 1980 Summer Olympics
Wrestlers at the 1984 Summer Olympics
Finnish male sport wrestlers
Sportspeople from South Ostrobothnia
World Wrestling Championships medalists